

Æthelwulf was a medieval Bishop of Elmham.

Æthelwulf was consecrated before 781 and died sometime after that year.

Notes

References

External links
 

Bishops of Elmham